Crn Vrv is a village in the municipality of Studeničani, North Macedonia.

Demographics
According to the 2021 census, the village had a total of 311 inhabitants. Ethnic groups in the village include:
Albanians 65
Turks 1
Others 244

References

Villages in Studeničani Municipality
Albanian communities in North Macedonia